Luciano Marangon (born 21 October 1956) is a retired Italian professional footballer who played as a defender. 

His younger brother Fabio Marangon also played football professionally. To distinguish them, Luciano was referred to as Marangon I and Fabio as Marangon II.

Honours
Verona
 Serie A champion: 1984–85

References

External links

 

1956 births
Living people
Italian footballers
Italy international footballers
Serie A players
Serie B players
L.R. Vicenza players
S.S.C. Napoli players
A.S. Roma players
Hellas Verona F.C. players
Inter Milan players

Association football defenders